Pamulaparti or Pamulaparthi (Telugu: పాములపర్తి) is one of Indian surnames.

 Pamulaparthi Sadasiva Rao,  thinker, philosopher and journalist
 Pamulaparthi Venkata Narasimha Rao, former Prime Minister of India

 Pamulaparti Venkata Ranga Rao, an Indian politician who belonged to the Indian National Congress and son of P. V. Narasimha Rao.

Indian surnames